Ubocze  is a village in the administrative district of Gmina Gryfów Śląski, within Lwówek Śląski County, Lower Silesian Voivodeship, in south-western Poland.

The village has a population of 1,500.

References

Villages in Lwówek Śląski County